Thalia dealbata, the powdery alligator-flag, hardy canna, or powdery thalia, is an aquatic plant in the family Marantaceae, native to swamps, ponds and other wetlands in the southern and central United States. Its range includes much of Coastal Plains and the lower Mississippi Valley (States of South Carolina, Georgia, Alabama, Mississippi, Louisiana, Texas, Oklahoma, Arkansas, Missouri, Illinois and Kentucky). The plant has been grown as an aquatic ornamental because of the pretty violet flowers, and in cultivation has been proved hardy as far north as Philadelphia (Pennsylvania) and Vancouver (British Columbia).

The blue-green leaves are ovate to lanceolate, dusted with white powder and with purple edges.

References

Flora of the United States
Freshwater plants
Plants described in 1794
dealbata